The Central Arctic was an electoral district of the Northwest Territories, Canada, created in 1966 and abolished in 1983. The district consisted of Pelly Bay, Spence Bay, Gjoa Haven, Cambridge Bay, Bathurst Inlet, Bay Chimo, Coppermine and Holman. For the 1983 election, Holman was moved to the Nunakput district and the others split between Kitikmeot West and Kitikmeot East. Today Holman, now Ulukhaktok, is the only one of the communities in the Northwest Territories as after division the others became part of Nunavut.

Members of the Legislative Assembly (MLAs)

References

Former electoral districts of Northwest Territories